Ameletos or Camila was a town of ancient Pontus, not far from the coast, a little to the west of Polemonium.

Its site is located in Asiatic Turkey.

References

Populated places in ancient Pontus
Former populated places in Turkey
History of Ordu Province